David Banks (born 28 November 1975 in Southampton, Hampshire) is a former English cricketer. Banks was a right-handed batsman who played primarily as a wicketkeeper.

Banks made his List-A debut for the Hampshire Cricket Board in the 1999 NatWest Trophy against the Suffolk. Banks played in five List-A matches for the Hampshire Cricket Board, the last of which came in the 1st round of 2003 Cheltenham and Gloucester Trophy which was played in 2002.

External links
David Banks at Cricinfo
David Banks at CricketArchive

1975 births
Living people
Cricketers from Southampton
English cricketers
Hampshire Cricket Board cricketers